Pizzo Campanile is a mountain of the Lepontine Alps on the Swiss-Italian border. On its northern side it overlooks the Val Cama.

References

External links
 Pizzo Campanile on Hikr

Mountains of the Alps
Mountains of Switzerland
Mountains of Lombardy
Mountains of Graubünden
Lepontine Alps
Italy–Switzerland border
International mountains of Europe
Two-thousanders of Switzerland